Congregational churches are Protestant churches in the Reformed tradition that practise congregationalist polity.

Congregational church may also refer to:

Denominations 
 United States denominations, except where stated otherwise.
 United Church of Christ a merger of:
Evangelical and Reformed Church
Congregational Christian Churches
 National Association of Congregational Christian Churches
 National Council of the Congregational Churches of the United States, 1865–1931
 Conservative Congregational Christian Conference
 Congregational Christian Churches in Canada
 Congregational Federation, a Congregational denomination in Great Britain

Individual churches 
List of Congregational churches

Other 
Church (congregation)

See also
 Congregationalist polity
 First Congregational Church (disambiguation)